Eidoreus politus is a species of beetle in the family Eupsilobiidae. It is found in Central America and North America.

References

Coccinelloidea
Articles created by Qbugbot
Beetles described in 1895